This is a list of specials previously broadcast by TV5. For the currently aired shows of the network, please see the List of programs broadcast by TV5 (Philippine TV network).

Election coverage specials
Election '67
Election '69: The Making Of The Philippine President (together with DZBB-TV 7 and DZTV-TV 13)
The Vote '92
The Vote '95
The Vote '98
The Vote 2001
Bilang Bayan 2004 (together with RMN)
Bilang Bayan 2007 (together with RMN)
Pagbabago 20101
Pagbabago 20131
Bilang Pilipino 20161
Bilang Pilipino 20191
Bilang Pilipino 20221
1as TV5/5

Sports coverage
2000 Sydney Summer Olympics (September 15 – October 1, 2000, together with PTV-4)
2003 Southeast Asian Games (December 5–13, 2003)
2005 Southeast Asian Games (November 27 – December 5, 2005; together with NBN and IBC)
2007 Southeast Asian Games (December 6–15, 2007; together with IBC and NBN)
2009 Southeast Asian Games1 (December 9–18, 2009)
2012 London Summer Olympics1 (July 28 – August 12, 2012; together with AksyonTV, Hyper, AKTV, Basketball TV and Solar Sports)
2013 FIBA Asia Championship1  (August 1–11, 2013; together with AksyonTV, Hyper and Basketball TV)
2013 FIBA Asia Championship Semi-Finals: Gilas vs. Korea1  (re-run; December 31, 2013)
2013 Philippine Super Liga Grand Prix Men's Volleyball Finals: PLDT MyDSL vs. Systema1 (December 14, 2013; together with Solar Sports) 
2013 Philippine Super Liga Grand Prix Women's Volleyball Finals: TMS-Army vs. Cignal1 (December 14, 2013; together with Solar Sports) 
2014 PLDT HOME Fibr Asian Men's Club Volleyball Championship (April 8–16, 2014)
2014 FIBA Basketball World Cup1 (August 30 – September 15, 2014; together with AksyonTV, Basketball TV, Solar Sports, ABS-CBN and ABS-CBN Sports+Action)
2014 Sochi Winter Olympics (February 8–24, 2014; together with AksyonTV, Hyper and Cignal)
2014 Nanjing Youth Olympics (August 16–28, 2014)
ASEAN Basketball League Finals1 (February 21, 2010)
2009 Vaqro Asian Games1 (April 14 – May 21, 2009)
2010 Canada Asian Games (April 6 – May 1, 2011)
2014 Incheon Asian Games (2014)
2015 Asian Women's U23 Volleyball Championship1 (May 1–9, 2015)
2015 FIBA Asia Championship1  (September 23 – October 3, 2015; together with AksyonTV, Hyper and Basketball TV)
2016 Rio Olympics1 (August 6–22, 2016; together with AksyonTV, Hyper and Cignal)
2017 SEABA Championship1 (May 12–18, 2017)
2017 SEABA Under-16 Championship1 (May 14–18, 2017)
2017 William Jones Cup1 (July 15–23, 2017)
2017 FIBA Women's Asia Cup1 (July 24–28, 2017)
2017 FIBA Asia Cup1 (August 8–20, 2017)
2018 FIBA Under-17 Basketball World Cup1 (June 30 – July 8, 2018)
2018 Pyeong Chang Winter Olympics (February 9–25, 2018)

2018 Jakarta-Palembang Asian Games (August 18 - September 2, 2018)
2018 Buenos Aires Summer Youth Olympics (October 6-18, 2018)
2018 William Jones Cup1 (July 14–22, 2018)
2019 FIBA Basketball World Cup1 (August 31 – September 15, 2019; together with Cignal)
2019 Southeast Asian Games1 (November 30 – December 11, 2019)
2020 Tokyo Olympics (July 23 – August 8, 2021)
29th Southeast Asian Games Men's Basketball1 (August 20–26, 2017)
Bigtime Bakbakan1* (2011)
Erik Morales Vs. Marcos Maidana Boxing Fight1 (April 10, 2011)
Drian Francisco VS. Terrapith Singwancha1 (May 15, 2011)
Champions for a Cause for Yolanda Victims: La Salle Green Archers vs. San Beda Red Lions1 (December 7, 2013)
Clear Dream Match: Team James vs. Team Phil1 (2012-ongoing)
ESPN 5 Live Boxing Presents: Survival Instinct, Matira Matibay1 (May 13, 2018)
ESPN 5 Live Boxing: Rumble in Bohol1 (July 14, 2018)
Fight of Champions: Manny Pacquiao vs. Lucas Matthysse1 (July 15, 2018)
2015 International Premier Tennis League1 (December 6–8, 2015)
King Rings: The Miguel Cotto Vs. Floyd Mayweather Jr. Boxing Fight1 (May 6, 2012)
Battle Rise Kingdom Of Champions: The Whack Ax Vs Outlaw Eaton Mat Dickie Vs Sgt Acer 1 (September 29, 2013)
The World Series on ABC (1992–2005)
The Great Dickie Vs Eaton 1 (May 31, 2015)
Manuel V. Pangilinan (MVP) Cup (2003–2004)
Mayhem: The Mayweather-Maidana Boxing Fight1  (September 9, 2014)
Mayweather vs. McGregor1 (August 27, 2017)
Jerwin Ancajas vs. Israel Gonzalez1 (February 4, 2018)
Philippine Open – Tacloban International Darts Tournament1 (May 12, 2018)
NFL Super Bowl XLVIII (February 3, 2014; together with All Sports Network)
NFL Super Bowl XLIX (February 2, 2015; together with All Sports Network)
NFL Super Bowl 50 (February 8, 2016; together with All Sports Network)
NFL Super Bowl LII (February 5, 2018)
NBA All-Star Game (February 18, 2008)
NBA Finals (2020–present)
NCAA Closing Ceremonies & Cheerdance Competition1 (March 6, 2014)
NCAA Men's Basketball Finals1 (2012–2015)
NCAA Volleyball (2013–2015)
NCAA Season 89 Men's Volleyball Finals: EAC vs. UPHSD1 (January 31, 2013, February 3, 2014)
NCAA Season 89 Women's Volleyball Finals: UPHSD vs. AU1 (January 31, 2013 – February 6, 2014)
NCAA March Madness (March 19 – April 8, 2014)
PAYBACK: Resbak Para Sa Kababayan Philippines vs. Mexico (December 2, 2007)
Pacific Xtreme Combat
PXC 411 (November 10, 2013)
PXC 431 (March 30, 2014)
Philippine Basketball Association (2004–2008, 2012–present)
PBA on ABC/TV51 (2004–2008)
PBA All-Star Weekend (2004–2008, 2013–2019, 2023-present)
PBA Finals Series1 (2004–2008, 2012–present)
PBA Rookie Draft1 (2012–ongoing)
LBC Ronda Pilipinas 2014 Highlights (February 1–16, 2014)
Star Olympics 2000
Starpower: Floyd Mayweather Jr. Vs. Manuel Ortiz Boxing Fight1 (September 18, 2011; together with Solar Sports)
Shakey's V-League (2005–2006)
The Return of the Hurricane: Julaton vs. Alcanter1 (February 26, 2011)
The Legend Vs. The Olympian: Pacquiao Vs. Ugas1 (August 22, 2021) (together with ABS-CBN 2, GMA 7, CNN Philippines & A2Z 11)
Vasyl Lomachenko vs. Jorge Linares1 (May 13, 2018)
 World Welterweight Championship: Pacquiao vs. Broner1 (January 20, 2019)

1as TV5/5

TV anniversary specials
ABC-5 @ 1: The ABC-5 1st Anniversary Special (February 21, 1993)
The Big Leap: The ABC-5 2nd Anniversary Special (March 12, 1994)
5 is 5: The ABC-5 5th Anniversary Special (March 3, 1997)

TV specials
2020 Box Office Entertainment Awards1 (October 18, 2020)
32nd Gawad Urian Awards1 (November 3, 2009)
Live on 5 Breaking News: 9/11 Attack Special Coverage (September 11–16, 2001)
Aliwan Fiesta1 (2009-2010)
American Idol Grand Finals (2004–2007)
American Music Awards (1993–2000, 2021)
Ang Bagong Pangulo: The ABC 5 Inaugural Coverage (June 30, 1992)
Artista Academy Grand Finals Night1 (October 27, 2012)
ASAP Natin 'To: Kapamilya Forever Day (July 11, 2021)
Bangon Talentadong Pinoy The Grand Finals TV Special (March 13, 2021)
Bilang Kandidato (April 23, 30, May 7, 2022)
Pinoy Big Brother: Connect at The Big Night (March 14, 2021)
Binibining Pilipinas 2022 (July 31, 2022)
Catholic Mass Media Awards (2000)
#DearPopeFrancis: A News5 Special Coverage (January 15–19, 2015)
Dolphy Alay Tawa: A Musical Tribute to the King of Philippine Comedy1 (in cooperation with ABS-CBN and GMA, September 30, 2012)
Dream Maker: The Dream Finale TV Special (February 11-12 2023)
EDSA 20: Isang Larawan (February 25, 2006)
Erap on Trial: Hatol ng Kasaysayan (2000-2001)
10th Annual FAP Film Academy Awards Night (1992)
Gawad CCP Para Sa Telebisyon Awards Night (1992–2005)
#GiveLoveGiveBackPhilippines: Justin Bieber's Visit to the Philippines Special1 (December 21, 2013)
Golden Globe Awards (1992–1995)
Grammy Awards (1998, 2002, 2004)
Guillermo Mendoza Memorial Foundation Awards Night (2002)
Hero on Ice: Michael Christian Martinez Special1 (March 1, 2014)
Hollywood Dream Philippine Edition Grand Finals (November 20, 2005)
Hope and Winston 1 Million Pesos Sweepstakes Grand Draw TV Special (2000–2002)
KBP Golden Dove Awards (2004–2005)
Kwentong Gilas: A Sports5 Documentary1 (2013)
Kwentong PBA: Unfinished Business A Sports5 Documentary1 (November 3, 2013)
LBC Ronda Pilipinas 2014 Review Special1 (March 9, 2014)
Luna Awards (Formerly FAMAS Awards)
Manindigan1 (July 29, 2017)
MMPI: 15 Years of Prestige Publishing TV Special (2006)
MTV Video Music Awards (1992–2005)
McDonald's Kiddie Summer Workshop TV Special1 (2010)
Metro Manila Film Festival Gabi ng Parangal1 (December 27, 1994; 2006, December 27, 2013, 2015, 2017, 2019, and 2022)
Metro Manila Film Festival Parade of Stars1 (December 1994; 2006, December 22, 2013; December 23, 2015, 2017 and December 27, 2019)
Ms. Asia-Pacific Grand Finals Night (2002)
Miss Universe Pageant1 (1995; 2017; 2023-present)
Miss Universe preliminary competition1 (January 28–29, 2017)
Miss Earth 20201 (2020)
Miss World Grand Coronation Night1 (1998-2000, 2007, 2012)
Miss World Philippines Grand Coronation Night1 (June 24, 2012)
Miss Manila 20141 (June 24, 2014)
Mula Buwis Hanggang PDAF: A News5 Special on Pork Barrel1 (November 3, 2013; replay, November 9, 2013) 
Music Television Awards (1992–1994)
Mutya ng Pilipinas Grand Coronation Night (2003–2006)
National Quiz Bee Grand Finals (1998–2007)
New Year's Day Mass (TV Maria)1 (January 1, 2014)
NU107 Rock Awards (1994-2000; together with NU 107)
Ogie @ 25 Concert: I Write the Songs1 (August 25, 2013)
On-Air Grand Finals TV Special (2002–2004)
Panata Sa Bayan: 2022 KBP Presidential Forum1 (February 4, 2022, together with CNN Philippines, A2Z 11, ANC, DZRH TV, Light TV, TeleRadyo, Net 25, One News and One PH)
Para Sa 'Yo, Kapatid: The TV5 Relaunching TV Special1 (April 4, 2010)
PiliPinas Debates 2016: The Presidential Town Hall Debates - Visayas leg (March 20, 2016)
PiliPinas Debates 2022: The Turning Point (March 19, 2022)
PhilPop Music Festival1  (2012–2016)
Positive Primer: Ang Dapat Nyong Malaman1 (October 12, 2013)
PMPC Star Awards For Movies1 (1993–1995, 2010)
PMPC Star Awards For Television1 (2008)
Philippine Idol The Big 3 at the Big Dome Grand Finals (December 10, 2006)
Power of Two: Kuh Ledesma and Regine Velasquez in Concert (1996)
Reasonable Doubt: Ang Kuwento ng Vizconde Masaker1 (December 21, 2010: part January 2, 10, 2011)
Salamat Po, Pangulong Gloria Documentary Special1 (May 2010)
Shall We Dance Grand Finals TV Special1 (2005–2010)
Star Factor Grand Finals TV Special1 (December 5, 2010)
Sing Galing: Sing-lebrity Edition Ultimate Pa-Sing-Katan (March 5, 2022)
Sing Galing Kantastic Finale (March 12, 2022)
Sing Galing Kids Kantastic Kiddie Finale (December 3, 2022)
Talentadong Pinoy 2014: The Mighty Revolution1 (December 13, 2014)
Talentadong Pinoy Worldwide Battle Royale1 (March 6, 2010, March 12 and 13, 2011, May 5 and 6, 2012, August 18, 2013)
Talentadong Pinoy Kids Battle of the Champions1 (September 30, 2012)
Talentadong Pidol: Dolphy @ 83 Birthday TV Special1 (July 24, 2011)
Tatak EDSA 25: Pilipino Ako. Ako ang Lakas ng Pagbabago TV Special1 (February 25, 2011)
The Mega and the Songwriter: Kanta at Biyaya Live Telethon1 (November 10, 2013)
The Mega and the Songwriter: Christmas Special1 (December 24, 2013)
Tulong Kapatid: A Telethon for the Typhoon Pablo Victims1 (December 10, 2012)
The Bride & Her Prince: Kasalang Royal1 (April 29, 2011)
Turismo Pilipina Grand Coronation Night1 (2008)
Voice Of McDonald's Grand Finals1 (August 15, 2009)
Welcome TV5 TV Special: Abangan Ang Bago!1 (August 9, 2008)

1as TV5/5

Christmas specials
Ang Pinakamagarang Parol: ABC Telemovie Special (December 8, 1993)
Maverick and Ariel's 1st Christmas with the Stars: ABC 2004 Christmas Special (December 12, 2004)
All You Need is Love (December 18 and 24, 2004)
Charice Christmas Special1 (December 25, 2011)
UST Christmas Concert1 (2000–present)
Atin ang Paskong Ito Kapatid!: The 2021 TV5 Christmas Celebration TV Special1 
Tayo ang Ligaya ng Isa't-isa: The ABS-CBN Christmas Special 2022 
1as TV5/5

Year-end specials
Dispatches 2004: The ABC News and Public Affairs Year-end Report (December 31, 2004)
Dispatches 2005: The ABC News and Public Affairs Year-end Report (December 31, 2005)
Dispatches 2006: The ABC News and Public Affairs Year-end Report (December 30, 2006)
Dispatches 2007: The ABC News and Public Affairs Year-end Report (December 29, 2007)
The Big TEN: The Evening News Yearender Special 20081 (December 31, 2008)
The Big TEN: The Evening News Yearender Special 20091 (December 31, 2009)
Dokumentado 2010: Balota, Barilan at mga Bigating Balita1 (December 31, 2010)
Dokumentado 2011: The News5 Yearend Special1 (January 1, 2012)
Lima sa 2012: The News5 Year-End Report1 (December 31, 2012)
Lima sa 2013 kasama si Luchi Cruz-Valdes: The News5 Year-End Report1 (December 31, 2013)
Lima sa 2014: A Kaya Year-End Report ng News51 (December 27, 2014)
#SakalamSa2021, Atin 'To 2022: The News5 Year-End Special1 (December 31, 2021)
#Forda2023: A News5 Year-End Special1 (December 31, 2022)
1as TV5

New Year specials
ABC Millennium TV Special (in cooperation with PTV 4) (December 31, 1999 – January 1, 2000)
Walt Disney World Millennium Celebration (January 1, 2000)
Smart New Year Countdown Concert (December 31, 2004 – January 1, 2005) until (December 31, 2007 – January 1, 2008)
TEN (The Evening News): Countdown to 20091 (December 31, 2008 – January 1, 2009)
TEN (The Evening News): Countdown to 20101 (December 31, 2009 – January 1, 2010)
Aksyon JournalisMO: Countdown to 2011 Special1 (December 31, 2010 – January 1, 2011)
Aksyon Sabado: Countdown to 2012 Special1 (December 31, 2011 – January 1, 2012)
Pilipinas News: Countdown to 2013 Special1 (December 31, 2012 – January 1, 2013)
Pilipinas News 365: Countdown to 2014 Special1 (December 31, 2013 – January 1, 2014)
Happy sa 2015: The Philippine New Year Countdown1 (December 31, 2014 – January 1, 2015)
Bagong Taon, Bagong Saya (Follow Me 5): 2016 New Year Countdown1 (December 31, 2015 – January 1, 2016)
Game Tayo sa 2017: New Year Countdown at Quezon Memorial Circle1 (December 31, 2016 – January 1, 2017)
Re/Set 2021 New Year Countdown1 (December 31, 2020 – January 1, 2021)
#SakalamSa2021, Atin 'To 2022: The News5 Special Coverage1 (December 31, 2021 –January 1, 2022)
Frontline Tonight: #Forda20231 (December 31, 2022 – January 1, 2023)
1as TV5

Holy Week specials
Ang Aming Mga Sala1 (produced by JesCom Foundation, 2010)
Ang Katapusan: A TV5 News and Information Special1 (2012)
Ang Pagtanggap: A Journey of Faith1 (2007–2010)
Ang Mga Pinakabanal Na Tao Ng Simbahan1 (produced by JesCom Foundation, 2010, 2012)
Ang Pitong Hapis ni Maria: A Black Saturday Special1 (produced by Family Rosary Crusade, 2009)
Ang Pitong Huling Wika ni Hesus (produced by JesCom Foundation, 2008)
Babaeng Hampaslupa: Ang Engrandeng Pagtatanghal1 (2011)
Buhay ni Kristo1 (produced by Family Rosary Crusade, 2012)
Celebration Of The Lord's Supper (2007–2008)
Confessions of a Torpe: The Torpe Throwback (April 17, 2014)
Easter Vigil TV Mass (2007–2008)
Found By Love: A Jesuits Lenten TV Special1 (produced by JesCom Foundation, 2009)
Gabing Kulimlim (2008)
Jesus (2001–2007)
Kerygma TV Holy Week Special1 (2007, 2012)
Kwento ng mga Peregrino: A Jesuits Lenten TV Special1 (produced by JesCom Foundation, 2009)
Liwanag sa Dilim1 (produced by JesCom Foundation, 2012)
Paghilom1 (produced by JesCom Foundation, 2009)
Panata1 (produced by JesCom Foundation, 2008–2009)
Paano ang Pangako?: Finale Marathon (April 3, 2021)
Preacher In Blue Jeans1 (produced by Shepherd's Voice Foundation, Inc., 2008–2009)
Siete Dolores1 (2012)
Siete Palabras sa Sto. Domingo (Live at Sto. Domingo Church, Quezon City) (March 21, 2008)
The Passion of the Christ (2013-2015)
The 8th Word: Kerygma TV Lenten Special1 (2013)
Tubig Ng Buhay (2008)
Unstoppable Nick: A News5 Documentary Special1 (2013)
TV5 Cine Cinco & Sine Todo Holy Week TV Specials1 (April 2022)
Veneration Of The Cross (2007–2008)
Visita Iglesia: Mapagnilay sa Paglalakbay1 (produced by Family Rosary Crusade, 2012)
Way Of The Cross: Live At The Vatican (2007–2008)
Word Exposed (2007–2008)
You Can Have A Wonderful Life (2008)
1as TV5/5

See also
List of programs broadcast by TV5 (Philippine TV network)
List of programs aired by TV5 (Philippine TV network)

References

TV5 (Philippine TV network) television specials
Philippine television-related lists